The Independent Presbyterian Church of Myanmar is a Reformed denomination in Myanmar that adheres to the Apostles Creed, Nicene Creed and the Westminster Confession. It was founded in 1938. The Independent Presbyterian Church had approximately 5,000 members and 182 congregations. There are no women ordination.

The church is a member of the World Communion of Reformed Churches.

References

Presbyterian denominations in Asia
Members of the World Communion of Reformed Churches
Churches in Myanmar